Dan Voiculescu (born 20 July 1940 in Saschiz, died 29 August 2009, in Bucharest) was a Romanian composer, doctor of musicology (1983), professor of counterpoint and composition at the Music Academy in Cluj-Napoca (since 1963) and the National Music University of Bucharest (since 2000), and a member of the Union of Romanian Composers and Musicologists (since 1965).

His musicological studies fill a niche in the Romanian bibliography; they are significant contributions towards understanding the polyphony of 20th-century classical music. His compositions are performed frequently, both in Romania and abroad.

Published works

Compositions
 The Bald Prima Donna, comical chamber opera, after Eugène Ionesco, 1992–1993
 Cantata for baritone, choir and orchestra, 1977
 Simfonia ostinato, 1963
 Visions cosmiques, 1968
 Music for strings, 1971
 Pieces for orchestra, 1975
 Suite from Codex Caioni for strings, 1996
 Inflorescences for strings,2001
 Works for piano solo
 Fables
 Dialogs
 Sonata
 Croquis
 Sonantes
 Spirals
 Toccata piano
 Toccata armonica
 Toccata robotica
 Toccata for a hand
 Book without end — 3 volumes of piano pieces for children
 Sonata brava for harpsichord
 9 Sonatas for flute solo
 Sonata for clarinet solo
 Sonata for oboe solo
 Ribattuta for viola solo, 1976
 Fiorituri for violin and piano
 about 60 Songs
 5 volumes of choral music for children
 Choral poems

Musicology
 Baroque Polyphony in the Works of J. S. Bach, 1975
 20th Century Polyphony, 1983 ("Polifonia secolului XX", Editura Muzicala, Bucuresti 2005 ) 
 The Bach Fugue, 1986 ("Fuga în creatia lui J. S. Bach", Editura Muzicala, Bucuresti 2000) 
 many other studies on musicology

His works are published by Editura Muzicala, Bucharest (Romania), Editura Arpeggione, Cluj-Napoca (Romania) and Musikverlag Gentner Hartmann, Trossingen (Germany).

Career
 1958–1964 Attended the "Gh. Dima" Music Academy of Cluj-Napoca (Romania)
 1963 Obtained diploma for Piano (under the supervision of Magda Kardos)
 1964 Obtained diploma for Composition (under the supervision of Sigismund Todutza)
 1965 Became a member of the Union of Romanian Composers
 1968 Studied composition with V. Mortari in Venice (Italy)
 1971–1972 Studied composition with K. Stockhausen in Cologne (Germany)
 1972, 1978 Attended the Darmstädter Kurse für Neue Musik
 1979–1991 Editor of Lucrari de Muzicologie (Musicological Works), published by the "Gh. Dima" Music Academy of Cluj-Napoca
 1983 Doctor of Musicology
 1984 Awarded the George Enesco Prize of the Romanian Academy
 1989 Awarded the Mihai Eminescu Prize
 1972–2005, seven times, Prize of the Union of Romanian Composers

External links

Memberships
 http://www.ucmr.org.ro/listMembri.asp?CodP=174#En
 Music Academy in Cluj-Napoca
 National Music University of Bucharest
 International Society of Contemporary Music in Romania
 Institute for the Memory of Culture

Recent performances
 Ramnicu Valcea Phylarmonic
 George Enescu Phylarmonic playing in Jerusalem (Romanian Global News)
 Emanuela Geamanu in the Romanian Athenaeum

Romanian classical composers
Romanian musicologists
20th-century classical composers
21st-century classical composers
Academic staff of the University of Bucharest
Musicians from Bucharest
Musicians from Cluj-Napoca
2009 deaths
1940 births
Male classical composers
20th-century musicologists
20th-century male musicians
21st-century male musicians